Zhang Shi (died 320) was the regional warlord and ruler in the Former Liang state.  He was the eldest son of Zhang Gui, who was a governor of Liang province under the Jin Dynasty. In 314, Zhang Shi inherited the title Duke of Xiping as well as the governorship of Liang from his father. He was also honored as Prince Ming of Former Liang

When the Western Jin Dynasty collapsed, Zhang Shi declared Liang an independent regional state, but decided to retain the Jin calendar system.  In 320 AD he was killed by an associate named Yan Sha. Zhang's younger brother Zhang Mao replaced him.

Notes

References

Monarchs of Former Liang
320 deaths
Chinese princes
Chinese warlords
Year of birth unknown